Cod Beck is a river in North Yorkshire, England.

Cod Beck has a long history of flooding Thirsk and a feasibility study completed in April 2005 recommended additional flood defences and upstream storage. In 2011, a proposed flood defence scheme in Thirsk was cancelled due to the Environment Agency having its budget cut by 41%.

The name Cod Beck is a derivative of Cold Beck, where beck is smaller than a river; the stream runs deep between banks, so is always fairly cool. Cod fish are not found in fresh water.

Settlements

from source

Osmotherley
Ellerbeck
Foxton
Kirby Sigston
Thornton-le-Street
North Kilvington
South Kilvington
Thirsk
Sowerby
Dalton

(Joins Swale)

References

External links

 Hambleton District Council page on Cod Beck.
 Cod Beck at Thirsk
 Wildlife News: Salmon return to North Yorkshire river.
 Photographs of Cod Beck flooding, 1999

Cod Beck